Harmandia mekongensis is a species of flowering plants. It is the only species in the monotypic genus of Harmandia. In the APG IV system, the genus is placed in the family Olacaceae. Other sources place it in the segregate family Aptandraceae.

Its native range is Indo-China to western Malesia. It is found in the countries of Borneo, Cambodia, Laos, Malaya, Sumatera and Thailand. 

The genus name of Harmandia is in honour of Jules Harmand (1845–1921), a French naval doctor and naturalist, who collected plants in south-east Asia, Japan and present-day Sri Lanka. The Latin specific epithet of mekongensis is named after the Mekong River from where the plant was collected. It was first described and published in Bull. Mens. Soc. Linn. Paris Vol.2 on page 770 in 1889.

References

Olacaceae
Flora of Indo-China
Flora of Malesia
Plants described in 1889